This is a list of Hawthorn Football Club players who have made one or more appearance in the Australian Football League (AFL), known as the Victorian Football League (VFL) until 1990. Hawthorn entered the VFL in 1925.

Hawthorn Football Club players (Men's)

Note: Statistics are correct as of the end of round 1, 2023.

1920s

1930s

1940s

1950s

1960s

1970s

1980s

1990s

2000s

2010s

2020s

Hawthorn Football Club players (Women's)
This is a list of Hawthorn Football Club women's players who have made one or more appearance in the AFL Women's (AFLW).

Note: Statistics are correct as of the end of S7 (2022).

See also
List of Hawthorn Football Club coaches

References 

AFL Tables – All Time Player List – Hawthorn
https://australianfootball.com/clubs/every player/Hawthorn+WFC/4764 Australian football – All Time AFLW Player List – Hawthorn

Hawthorn
 
Hawthorn
Hawthorn Football Club coaches